Jacob Taylor Bixenman (born May 27, 1994) is an American model. He was born in Orange County, California.

Career 
Bixenman entered into a VMan modelling competition and was signed by Ford Models, who handle Naomi Campbell, Courteney Cox and Lana Del Rey amongst others. He has walked the New York Fashion Week. Bixenman has also modelled for Palomo Spain, Dolce & Gabbana, Jean-Paul Gaultier, Ovadia & Sons, Forever 21, Pull&Bear, Yves Saint Laurent, Moncler Gamme Bleu and Valentino. He is the face of Topman. Bixenman has also done a podcast "Unspoken" created by Ruthie Lindsey and Miles Adcox. His works have also been published in Vogue (magazine) and V Magazine. He has also worked with Ralph Lauren Corporation by modelling their new gender-neutral Pride collection. Along with Troye Sivan, he also was a part of MAC Cosmetics' 2019 Pride Collection. Bixenman was a part of the music video of "Heaven," a song by Sivan, and "Lonely Cities" by Tigertown.

Apart from modelling, he also makes short videos. He has had success as a creative director, working as the creative director for Miley Cyrus's Attention music video released in early 2022. He worked with her again in 2023, directing the music videos for "Flowers" and "River", two singles of Cyrus's Endless Summer Vacation album.

Personal life 
He started dating Australian singer and actor Troye Sivan in 2016, and made a cameo in Sivan's music video for "Heaven". They were a couple for four years.
His elder brother, Taylor Bixenman, died in January 2018. Jacob has a tattoo "Tay" on his finger, dedicated to Taylor.

Music videos

References

External links 
 

1994 births
Living people
Male models from California
LGBT models
People from Orange County, California
LGBT people from California